DCV can mean:

 605 (DCV in Roman numerals), a common year starting on Friday of the Julian calendar
 605 (number), a harshad number in Roman numerals
 Basque Christian Democracy (Democracia Cristiana Vasca), a Basque Country Christian-democratic party
 DCV, a a generic ship prefix for deepwater construction vessels
 Demand controlled ventilation, a feedback control method to maintain indoor air quality
 Directional control valve, one of the most fundamental parts of hydraulic and pneumatic systems
 Drosophila C virus, a viral disease of the genus Cripavirus